Scott L. Bentley (born April 10, 1974) is a former American football placekicker.  He played in the National Football League (NFL) for parts of four seasons with the Atlanta Falcons, the Denver Broncos, the Kansas City Chiefs, and the Washington Redskins.  He was also a member of the 2001 World Bowl Champion Berlin Thunder of NFL Europa.  He attended and graduated from Florida State University and Overland High School in Aurora, Colorado.

Bentley kicked the game-winning field goal as Bobby Bowden's Florida State Seminoles won their first national title, beating Nebraska, 18–16, in the 1994 Orange Bowl.

Bentley was on the cover of Sports Illustrateds College Football Preview in 1993, later to be victimized by the "Cover Jinx" after missing seven extra point attempts in the season's first five games.

After his NFL career, Bentley moved back to Colorado and works as a BDC Manager and is an avid softball player.

References

1974 births
Living people
American football placekickers
Atlanta Falcons players
Berlin Thunder players
Denver Broncos players
Florida State Seminoles football players
Kansas City Chiefs players
Washington Redskins players
Players of American football from Dallas
Sportspeople from Aurora, Colorado
Players of American football from Colorado